Alphonse Bertrand (August 23, 1846 – April 8, 1926) was a merchant and political figure in New Brunswick. He represented Madawaska County in the Legislative Assembly of New Brunswick from 1895 to 1899 as a Conservative member.

He was born and educated in Quebec City, the son of Isaac Bertrand and Elizabeth Kennedy. Bertrand was customs collector for the port of Edmundston from 1865 to 1867. After that, he was in business at Fort Kent, Maine until 1887 when he returned to Edmundston. In 1880, he married Catherine Kate Hartt, a niece of John Costigan. He was defeated in the 1899 provincial election. After retiring from politics, he joined the federal public service.

References 
 New Brunswick political biographies, Irish Canadian Cultural Association of New Brunswick 
 Archives of the Religious Hospitallers of Saint Joseph, Saint-Basile, New Brunswick
The Canadian parliamentary companion, 1897, JA Gemmill

1846 births
1926 deaths
Canadian Roman Catholics
People from Edmundston
Progressive Conservative Party of New Brunswick MLAs